William L. "Spider" Nyland (born October 2, 1946), a veteran of the Vietnam War, is a retired United States Marine Corps four-star General who served as the Assistant Commandant of the Marine Corps from 2002 to 2005.  He retired from the Marine Corps in November 2005 after over 37 years of distinguished service.

Marine Corps career
Nyland was commissioned a second lieutenant in the Marine Corps under the Naval ROTC program upon graduation in 1968 from the University of New Mexico. In addition to attaining a Master of Science degree from the University of Southern California, his formal military education includes The Basic School (1968), Naval Aviation Flight Training (NFO) (1969), Amphibious Warfare School (1975), Navy Fighter Weapons School (TOPGUN) (1977), College of Naval Command and Staff, Naval War College (1981), and the Air War College (1988).

He was advanced to first lieutenant on September 5, 1969, captain on February 1, 1972, major on September 1, 1978, and lieutenant colonel on April 1, 1984.

After being assigned to Marine Fighter Attack Squadron 351 (VMFA-531), he was ordered to Vietnam, where he flew 122 combat missions with VMFA-314 and VMFA-115. His other tours included: Instructor RIO, Marine Fighter Attack Training Squadron 101 (VMFAT-101); Squadron Assistant Operations Officer and Operations Officer, VMFA-115; and Brigade FORSTAT and Electronic Warfare Officer, 1st Marine Brigade. He also served as Operations Officer and Director of Safety and Standardization, VMFA-212; Aviation Safety Officer and Congressional Liaison/Budget Officer, Headquarters, U.S. Marine Corps, Washington, D.C.; and Operations Officer, Marine Aircraft Group 24, 1st Marine Amphibious Brigade. He commanded VMFA-232, the Marine Corps' oldest and most decorated fighter squadron, from July 1985 to July 1987.

Lieutenant Colonel Nyland subsequently served as section chief for the Central Command Section, European Command/Central Command Branch, Joint Operations Division, Directorate of Operations (J-3), Joint Staff, Washington, D.C. He was promoted to colonel on February 1, 1990. In July 1990, Colonel Nyland assumed command of Marine Aviation Training Support Group Pensacola, Florida. Following his command of MATSG, he assumed duties as Chief of Staff, 2nd Marine Aircraft Wing (2MAW) on July 5, 1992, and assumed additional duties as Assistant Wing Commander on November 10, 1992. He was promoted to brigadier general on September 1, 1994 and was assigned as Assistant Wing Commander, 2MAW, serving in that billet until December 1, 1995.

Brigadier General Nyland served next on the Joint Staff, J-8, as the Deputy Director for Force Structure and Resources, completing that tour on June 30, 1997. He was advanced to major general on July 2, 1997, and assumed duties as the Deputy Commanding General, II Marine Expeditionary Force, Camp Lejeune, North Carolina. He then served as the Commanding General, 2nd Marine Aircraft Wing, from July 1998 to June 2000. He was advanced to lieutenant general on June 30, 2000 and assumed duties as the Deputy Commandant for Programs and Resources, Headquarters, U.S. Marine Corps. He next assumed duties as the Deputy Commandant for Aviation on August 3, 2001. He was advanced to general on September 4, 2002, and assumed his duties as the Assistant Commandant of the Marine Corps on September 10, 2002.

General Nyland served as the Assistant Commandant of the Marine Corps, Headquarters Marine Corps, Washington D.C., from September 2002 until September 7, 2005. He retired from active duty on November 1, 2005.

Awards
His personal decorations include:

In retirement
As of August 2006, Nyland serves as Deputy Director for Defense Research and Development for the Florida Institute for Human and Machine Cognition (IHMC). He is on the Board of Directors for FreeLinc.

Nyland served as Chairman of Toys for Tots He also served as Chairman of the Marine Corps Scholarship Foundation and He also served as The National Commander for the Marine Corps Aviation Association (January 2007-January 2010).

See also

List of United States Marine Corps four-star generals

Notes

References

External links

Living people
1946 births
United States Marine Corps generals
Assistant Commandants of the United States Marine Corps
University of New Mexico alumni
University of Southern California alumni
College of Naval Command and Staff alumni
Air War College alumni
United States Naval Flight Officers
United States Marine Corps personnel of the Vietnam War
Recipients of the Legion of Merit
Recipients of the Air Medal
Recipients of the Gallantry Cross (Vietnam)
Florida Institute for Human and Machine Cognition people
Recipients of the Defense Distinguished Service Medal